"Play Dead" is a song by Icelandic singer-songwriter Björk, released as the only single from the soundtrack of the 1993 crime drama The Young Americans, starring Harvey Keitel. It was not included in the first edition of Debut but was later included as a bonus track, and the album was re-issued in November 1993. The song was written by Jah Wobble, Björk featuring David Arnold, and was produced by Cannon, Arnold, receiving additional production and mixing by Tim Simenon.

"Play Dead", inspired by the main character of the film, was released on 11 October 1993 and charted within the top 20 in Denmark, Iceland, Ireland, the Netherlands, Norway, Sweden, and the United Kingdom. An accompanying music video was released, featuring images from the film. "Play Dead" was included in Björk's 2002 greatest hits album Greatest Hits.

Background and composition

The song was co-written by Jah Wobble, Björk featuring David Arnold. Björk was asked to write the melody and lyrics for the song, while Wobble wrote the bass part and Arnold composed the score, which Björk described as a "greatest hits of what's in the film".

Björk described the writing as "very difficult" because "the character in the film was suffering and going through hardcore tough times and at the time I was at my happiest". To help her in the writing, she asked the film's director, Danny Cannon, to write her a whole page of phrases that represented the emotions of the characters in the film, but she used only one line that Cannon wrote: "Sometimes, it's just like sinking", and still she changed it to "It's sometimes just like sleeping" in the actual lyrics.

The song is underscored by moody strings and its lyrics about acting numb to prevent emotional pain. Björk wrote it from the main character's point of view: "In the film, he had a girlfriend who just wanted him to be happy and in love and he just couldn't get his head around it. It was just me trying to imagine what he would say to her. Things he never actually said to her in the film but things he would have said to her".

Produced by David Arnold and Danny Cannon, the song was originally a non-album track recorded for the film The Young Americans and intended as a single-only release, but eventually it was added as a bonus track to international pressings of Björk's album Debut because Björk's manager Derek Birkett convinced her to add the track. Björk also sings on the tracks "Opening Titles" and "Leaving London" on the soundtrack CD of the film. In both the film and soundtrack, "Leaving London" crescendoes into "Play Dead" as a single arrangement. In both the album and the single version, the song is actually a remix by Tim Simenon. After the addition of "Play Dead" on Debut, about 100 people who already owned the album without the bonus track, called the record company and complained, demanding to be given new records as compensation.

The drums which the song is structured by are taken from the beginning of the 1977 song "Footsteps in the Dark" by The Isley Brothers, most famously used on Ice Cube's "It Was A Good Day", which was released earlier that year.

Critical reception
The track was well received by music critics. Derek Birkett described it as "one of the best things Björk’s ever done". Alexis Petridis of Blender stated that it "boasts a chorus that’s both original and implausibly epic". In his weekly UK chart commentary, James Masterton wrote that it is "a haunting beautiful piece of music to rank alongside anything she ever did with the Sugarcubes and becoming a bigger hit than she ever had with her former band in the first place." Pan-European magazine Music & Media noted that "the clamour of Iceland's siren is in the air again, beautifully floating above superb rhythm tracks. Highly original; there's nothing like this on the entire planet." Tom Doyle from Smash Hits gave "Play Dead" four out of five, viewing it as "a grand sweeping groovy orchestral thing which sounds like an unhinged Bono theme and will make the hairs on the back of your neck tingle. Remarkable." The Tech journalist Fred Choi, while reviewing Greatest Hits stated that the song is "compelling but lesser-known". Mal Pearchey of Vox described it as "incredibly sophisticated after the eclectic drama of The Sugarcubes".

Music video

The accompanying music video for "Play Dead" was directed by Danny Cannon, who also directed The Young Americans. In the video, Björk performs the song in an empty bar that is shown in the film. Her footage is intercut with scenes from the film that range from tenderness to violence. It was criticised because of its simplicity, with some pointing out it lacks the visual characteristics of other Björk videos. The video has been said to follow "the trends of MTV".

Live performances
Björk performed the song in selected dates of her Debut Tour, and usually sang it during her Homogenic Tour, accompanied by a larger ensemble of strings. Björk's performance at the Union Chapel with the Brodsky Quartet was met with enthusiasm by The Guardian journalist Maddy Costa, that described the performance as a "Heavenly Experience" and, commenting the song's performance, stated that "reclaiming "Play Dead" from ad-land, the subdued volume and the Brodskys’ bristling tone brought out the fierceness of Björk’s words".

Björk also performed the song during her Vespertine World Tour. The song has not been performed live since then.

Track listings
 7-inch and cassette single
A. "Play Dead" (Tim Simenon 7-inch remix) – 4:00
B. "Play Dead" (Tim Simenon orchestral mix) – 4:01

 European and Japanese CD single
 "Play Dead" (Tim Simenon 7-inch remix) – 3:57
 "Play Dead" (Tim Simenon orchestral mix) – 4:01
 "Play Dead" (Tim Simenon 12-inch remix) – 5:26
 "End Titles/Play Dead" (original film mix) – 3:52

 UK and Australian CD single
 "Play Dead" (Tim Simenon 7-inch remix) – 3:57
 "Play Dead" (Tim Simenon orchestral mix) – 4:01
 "Play Dead" (Tim Simenon 12-inch remix) – 5:26
 "Play Dead" (Tim Simenon instrumental) – 3:57
 "End Titles/Play Dead" (original film mix) – 3:52

Charts

Weekly charts

Year-end charts

Covers
A cover of the song appears on the special edition of the album Into by the Finnish band the Rasmus. It is available on many of their singles as well, including "Madness". In 2007, The Swedish band Pain covered the song on the album Psalms of Extinction.

Usage in media
A modified version of the song was also used in 1995 on the launch advert for the new Vauxhall Vectra, with the tagline "Designed for the next millennium".

References

External links
 Play Dead webpage

Björk songs
1993 singles
1993 songs
Island Records singles
One Little Indian Records singles
The Rasmus songs
Songs written by Björk
Songs written by David Arnold